Gavlan (also Romanized as Gavlān and Gūlān) is a village in Zulachay Rural District, in the Central District of Salmas County, West Azerbaijan Province, Iran. At the 2006 census, its population was 209, in 40 families.

References 

Populated places in Salmas County